Claude H. Lindsley (1894 - 1969) was an American architect based in Mississippi.

Early life
Claude H. Lindsley was born in Lincoln County, Mississippi in 1894.

Career

During his career, he worked primarily in Mississippi, with offices in Jackson and Ocean Springs. He also worked in Houston, Texas and Washington, D.C.

He designed 225 E. Capitol Street, built in 1928 in the Smith Park Architectural District, the Hugh Lawson White Mansion where former Governor of Mississippi Hugh L. White lived in Columbia, Mississippi (a contributing property to Keys Hill Historic District), and Threefoot Building (1929) in Meridian, Mississippi. Several buildings he designed are listed on the National Register of Historic Places (NRHP).

Later life and death
Lindsley died in 1969 in Jackson, Mississippi. He is buried in Lakewood Cemetery.

Work
Central High School (1923) in Jackson, a Mississippi Landmark
Hugh White Mansion in Columbia (1925)
Lorena Duling School (1927) at 622 Duling Avenue in Jackson, a city landmark
Two buildings at Belhaven College in Jackson (1927)
Sacred Heart Catholic Church (1928) in Canton
Crystal Springs High School (1928) in Crystal Springs 
Threefoot Building (1929) NRHP listed
Robert E. Lee Hotel (1930) in Jackson. Closed to avoid having to integrate in 1964. Bought by the state in 1969. Later became a Mental Health Department building.
Hinds County Courthouse (1930) on Pascagoula Street in Jackson, NRHP listed
Alcorn State buildings
Delta State buildings
Mississippi University for Women buildings
Mississippi State buildings 
Fulton Chapel at Ole Miss
Pascagoula High School, section, in partnership with Ft. Worth architect Wyatt C. Hedrick
Tower Building (Standard Life building) in Jackson
First National Bank in Ocean Springs, his last known project
Bellevue Court Apartments at 950 North Street in Jackson. NRHP listed
Gautier School expansion and additional buildings at 505 Magnolia Tree Drive in Gautier, Mississippi. NRHP listed
Contributing property to the Smith Park Architectural District (Boundary Increase II) at 308 E. Pearl Street in Jackson 
Contributing property to the Smith Park Architectural District (Boundary Increase) at 225 East Capitol Street in Jackson 
Washington County Courthouse at 110 E. Main in Brenham, Texas as Hendrick & Lindsley Inc.

References

External links

1894 births
1969 deaths
Architects from Mississippi
People from Lincoln County, Mississippi
People from Jackson, Mississippi